Yeniyazı, historically Cidet, is a village in the Nizip District, Gaziantep Province, Turkey. The village is inhabited by Turks.

References

Villages in Nizip District